On June 12, 2022, at least 100 civilians were killed in a massacre by suspected Islamists in the village of Seytenga, located in a department of the same name in Séno Province, Burkina Faso.

The attack occurred around 4:00 or 5:00 PM. A survivor recalled that the terrorists "went from shop to shop, sometimes torching [them]... They opened fire on anyone who tried to run away." Homes also were reported to have been burned during the massacre.

Authorities confirmed at least 79 deaths, but expected there to be over 100. Other estimates said that the death toll was 165. According to Reuters, quoting anonymous sources, the attackers "targeted men but appeared to spare women and children". 3,000 residents of the town were displaced to Dori.

The EU and the UN denounced the massacre, along with Interim President of Burkina Faso Paul-Henri Sandaogo Damiba, who declared a 72-hour national day of mourning.

It was the worst attack in the Jihadist insurgency in Burkina Faso since the 2021 Solhan and Tadaryat massacres.

References 

Seytenga
Seytenga
Seytenga
Seytenga
Seytenga
Attacks on shops
Seytenga
Seytenga
Seytenga
Seytenga
Seytenga
Séno Province
Seytenga
Seytenga
Seytenga